The following is a list of squads for each national team that competed at the 2017 UEFA European Under-17 Championship in Croatia. Each national team had to submit a squad of 18 players born on or after 1 January 2000.

Group A

Croatia 
Head coach:  Dario Bašić

Spain 
Head coach:  Santiago Denia

1.  Carlos Beitia was called up during the tournament due to an injury to Álvaro García Segovia.

Turkey 
Head coach:  Mehmet Hacıoğlu

Italy 
Head coach:  Emiliano Bigica

1.  Luca Gemello was called up during the tournament due to an injury to Marco Carnesecchi. Flavio Bianchi was called up due to an injury to Fabrizio Caligara.

Group B

Scotland 
Head coach:  Scot Gemmill

France 
Head coach:  Lionel Rouxel

Hungary 
Head coach:  Zoltán Szélesi

Faroe Islands 
Head coach:  Áki Johansen

Group C

Germany 
Head coach:  Christian Wück

Republic of Ireland 
Head coach:  Colin O'Brien

Serbia 
Head coach:  Perica Ognjenović

Bosnia and Herzegovina 
Head coach:  Sakib Malkočević

Group D

Netherlands 
Head coach:  Kees Van Wonderen

Norway
Head coach:  Erland Johnsen

Ukraine
Head coach:  Serhiy Popov

England
Head coach:  Steve Cooper

1. Joel Latibeaudiere was called up during the tournament due to an injury to Tashan Oakley-Boothe.

References

External links
Squads on UEFA.com

UEFA European Under-17 Championship squads
2017 UEFA European Under-17 Championship